Nidhin Lal (born 7 June 1991 in Kerala) is a former Indian footballer who most recently played for Minerva Punjab in the I-League.

Career

Mumbai
Nidhin has played for Tamil Nadu and stood 3rd in the Santosh Trophy. He has played for Clubs such as Indian Bank and Pune F.C. In the summer of 2011 he signed with Mumbai F.C. of the I-League and made his first team debut in the I-League against Mohun Bagan on 6 November 2011.

Chennaiyin FC
In July 2015 Lal was drafted to play for Chennaiyin FC in the 2015 Indian Super League.

Legal issues

In January 2020, Lal was arrested by police in Vasco for running a prostitution parlour alongside Shyni Joseph. The pair were granted bail later in the month.

Career statistics

Club

 Statistics accurate as of 11 July 2015

Apps = Appearances || C S = Clean Sheets

References

Indian footballers
1990s births
Living people
Footballers from Kerala
I-League players
Mumbai FC players
Chennaiyin FC players
Association football goalkeepers